The following is a List of architecture schools in Italy:

Technical Universities (Politecnici) 
 Marche Polytechnic University, Facoltà di Ingegneria, Ancona
 Politecnico di Bari, Facoltà di Architettura, Bari
 Politecnico di Milano, Facoltà di Architettura, Milan
 Politecnico di Torino, Facoltà di Architettura 1 e 2, Turin

Universities (Università) 
 Università di Bologna, Facoltà di Architettura Aldo Rossi, Bologna
 University of Brescia, Facoltà di Ingegneria, Brescia
 University of Camerino, Facoltà di Architettura, Camerino
 University of Cagliari, Facoltà di Architettura, Cagliari
 Università di Catania, Facoltà di Architettura, Syracuse, Sicily
 D'Annunzio University of Chieti–Pescara, Facoltà di Architettura, Pescara
 Kore University of Enna, Facoltà di Architettura, Enna
 Università di Ferrara, Facoltà di Architettura, Ferrara
 Università di Firenze, Facoltà di Architettura, Florence
 University of Genoa, Facoltà di Architettura, Genoa
 University of L'Aquila, Facoltà di Ingegneria, L'Aquila
 Università degli Studi di Napoli Federico II, Facoltà di Architettura, Naples
 Second University of Naples, Facoltà di Architettura, Naples
 University of Padua, Facoltà di Ingegneria, Padua
 University of Palermo, Facoltà di Architettura, Palermo
 University of Parma, Facoltà di Architettura, Parma
 University of Pavia, Facoltà di Ingegneria, Pavia
 University of Pisa, Facoltà di Ingegneria, Pisa
 Basilicata University, Facoltà di Architettura, Potenza
 University of Reggio Calabria, Facoltà di Architettura, Reggio Calabria
 University of Calabria, Facoltà di Ingegneria, Rende
 Sapienza University of Rome, Facoltà di Architettura, Rome
 University of Rome Tor Vergata, Facoltà di Ingegneria, Rome
 Università degli Studi Roma Tre, Facoltà di Architettura, Rome
 University of Salerno, Facoltà di Ingegneria, Salerno
 University of Sannio, Facoltà di Ingegneria, Benevento
 University of Sassari, Facoltà di Architettura, Alghero
 University of Trento, Facoltà di Ingegneria, Trento
 University of Trieste, Facoltà di Architettura, Trieste
 University of Udine, Facoltà di Ingegneria, Udine
 Università IUAV di Venezia, Facoltà di Architettura (FAR), Venice

References

See also 
 List of international architecture schools
 Open access in Italy

 
Architecture schools in Italy
Italy